Virtual Hospital is an international non-government organization that operates as part of Virtual Healthcare Limited. Virtual Hospital uses telemedicine to deliver medical care to the developing world.

How Virtual Hospital Works
Virtual Hospital interconnects villages in the developing world with their main county hospitals, and hospitals in the West using Telemedicine. Virtual Hospital is based on a traditional healthcare referral system, where the patient's medical information is collected by e-clinics in rural third world communities using a computer, or mobile phone and sent to a general medical practitioner (GP) based at the Virtual Hospital (Hub).  The GP at the Hub then either provides a diagnosis or refers the patient to the relevant Virtual Hospital Department where specialist consultants across the world are linked together through the Internet.

Influence on Virtual Hospital
The work of Virtual Hospital is influenced to a great extent by reports published by the World Health Organization (WHO) on Telemedicine developments, American Telemedicine Association  and the work of Zaidi, et al. and Denis Gilhooly Principal Adviser in the United Nations.

According to WHO's report on 'Telemedicine - Opportunities and Developments in Member States' : 'Information and communication technologies have great potential to address some of the challenges met both developed and developing countries in providing accessible, cost effective high quality health care services. Telemedicine uses ICTs to overcome geographical barriers and increase access to healthcare services. This is particularly beneficial for rural and underserved communities in developing countries - groups that traditionally suffer from lack of access to healthcare.'

References 

World Health Organization
Hospitals
Types of hospitals